Brownstown is the name of more than one place in the U.S. state of Pennsylvania:
Brownstown, Armstrong County, Pennsylvania
Brownstown, Cambria County, Pennsylvania
Brownstown, Fayette County, Pennsylvania
Brownstown, Lancaster County, Pennsylvania